Mirko Raičević (Cyrillic: Mиpкo Paичeвић, born 22 March 1982), also known by his nickname Ćiro, is a Montenegrin footballer who finished his career at OFK Titograd.

International career
He made his debut for Montenegro in his country's first ever competitive match on 24 March 2007, a friendly against Hungary in Podgorica. He also played in the Kirin Cup, in June 2007 and earned a total of 3 caps, scoring no goals.

Honours
Budućnost
Montenegrin First League: 2007–08

References

External links
 Profile and NT stats at Montenegrin Federation site.
 

1982 births
Living people
Footballers from Podgorica
Association football midfielders
Serbia and Montenegro footballers
Montenegrin footballers
Montenegro international footballers
FK Obilić players
FK Mladi Obilić players
FK Budućnost Podgorica players
FC Zorya Luhansk players
FC Chornomorets Odesa players
FC Hoverla Uzhhorod players
OFK Titograd players
Second League of Serbia and Montenegro players
First League of Serbia and Montenegro players
Montenegrin First League players
Ukrainian Premier League players
Ukrainian First League players
Montenegrin expatriate footballers
Expatriate footballers in Ukraine
Montenegrin expatriate sportspeople in Ukraine